The Jima River (Spanish: Río Jima) is a  long river in central Dominican Republic. The Rincón Reservoir (Spanish: Presa de Rincón) lies along the river. The river originates in Las Neblinas, Bonao, Monseñor Nouel Province and reaches its mouth at the Camú River in Jima Abajo, La Vega Province.

References

Rivers of the Dominican Republic
Geography of Monseñor Nouel Province
Geography of La Vega Province